The Mercers' School was an independent school in the City of London, England, with a history going back at least to 1542, and perhaps much further. It was operated by the Worshipful Company of Mercers and was closed in 1959.

History
After the dissolution of the Hospital of St Thomas of Acre in 1538, the hospital's land was bought by the Mercers' Company, and the school was founded in 1542 under letters patent of King Henry VIII dated 18 April 1542. It is possible that the new school continued one that had been established in the hospital by an Act of Parliament of 1447, which may have dated back as far as the foundation of the hospital itself in 1190. At different times the school had several different homes in the City of London: Cheapside, Old Jewry, and College Hill (Dowgate); in 1894 it moved to Barnard's Inn, a site on the south side of Holborn.

The school was admitted to the Headmasters' Conference in 1935. It finally closed in 1959.

The passageway leading to the Mercers' School's porter's lodge and playground with Queen Anne headstone (which traditionally new boys were forced to kiss), the Headmaster's rooms and dining hall, with early flags and inscribed panel walls giving the names and dates of headmasters over the centuries, still exist at the Barnard's Inn buildings in Chancery Lane. The Guild of Mercers' Scholars was established  1947 as the "Civic Guild of Old Mercers", with the aim of encouraging former students to become Freemen of the City of London and join livery companies pertaining to their trades or professions.

Former pupils 
Those educated at the Mercers' School include:

 Sir Thomas James Barnes (1888–1964), lawyer
 James Boevey (1622–1696), merchant, lawyer and philosopher
 Peter Southouse Cheyney (1896–1951), crime writer
 Frederic George D'Aeth (1875–1940), social administrator and lecturer 
 Cyril Dean Darlington (1903–1981), biologist
 Stanley Clinton Davis, Baron Clinton-Davis (born 1928)
 Sir Henry Ellis (1777–1869), librarian
 Sir Alfred Gilbert (1854–1934), sculptor
 Arthur Allan Gomme (1882–1955), librarian and president of The Folklore Society
 Sir Bradford Leslie (1831–1926), civil engineer 
 Douglas Neil Kennedy (1892–1988), folk musician and dancer
 Peter Nailor (1928–1996), academic 
 Robert Paynter (1928–2010), cinematographer
 Nicolas Roeg (1928–2018), film director
 William Lloyd Webber (1914–1982), organist and composer
 Edward Wynn (1889–1956), bishop
 John Young ( 1532–1605), bishop

References 

 "Mercers' School", in The Times, 4 December 1933, p. 9

External links
 Mercers' School History

1542 establishments in England
Educational institutions established in the 1540s
Defunct schools in the City of London
Buildings and structures in the City of London
1959 disestablishments in England
Educational institutions disestablished in 1959